This is a list of moths of families starting from A to C that are found in Metropolitan France (including Corsica). It also acts as an index to the species articles and forms part of the full List of Lepidoptera of Metropolitan France.

Family Adelidae 

Adela albicinctella Mann, 1852
Adela australis (Heydenreich, 1851)
Adela croesella (Scopoli, 1763)
Adela cuprella (Denis & Schiffermuller, 1775)
Adela mazzolella (Hübner, 1801)
Adela paludicolella Zeller, 1850
Adela reaumurella (Linnaeus, 1758)
Adela violella (Denis & Schiffermuller, 1775)
Cauchas albiantennella (Burmann, 1943)
Cauchas fibulella (Denis & Schiffermuller, 1775)
Cauchas leucocerella (Scopoli, 1763)
Cauchas rufifrontella (Treitschke, 1833)
Cauchas rufimitrella (Scopoli, 1763)
Nematopogon adansoniella (Villers, 1789)
Nematopogon metaxella (Hübner, 1813)
Nematopogon pilella (Denis & Schiffermuller, 1775)
Nematopogon robertella (Clerck, 1759)
Nematopogon schwarziellus Zeller, 1839
Nematopogon swammerdamella (Linnaeus, 1758)
Nemophora associatella (Zeller, 1839)
Nemophora barbatellus (Zeller, 1847)
Nemophora congruella (Zeller, 1839)
Nemophora cupriacella (Hübner, 1819)
Nemophora degeerella (Linnaeus, 1758)
Nemophora dumerilella (Duponchel, 1839)
Nemophora fasciella (Fabricius, 1775)
Nemophora metallica (Poda, 1761)
Nemophora minimella (Denis & Schiffermuller, 1775)
Nemophora mollella (Hübner, 1813)
Nemophora ochsenheimerella (Hübner, 1813)
Nemophora pfeifferella (Hübner, 1813)
Nemophora prodigellus (Zeller, 1853)
Nemophora raddaella (Hübner, 1793)
Nemophora violellus (Herrich-Schaffer in Stainton, 1851)

Family Alucitidae

Alucita bidentata Scholz & Jackh, 1994
Alucita cancellata (Meyrick, 1908)
Alucita cymatodactyla Zeller, 1852
Alucita desmodactyla Zeller, 1847
Alucita grammodactyla Zeller, 1841
Alucita hexadactyla Linnaeus, 1758
Alucita huebneri Wallengren, 1859
Alucita palodactyla Zeller, 1847
Alucita tridentata Scholz & Jackh, 1994
Alucita zonodactyla Zeller, 1847
Pterotopteryx dodecadactyla Hübner, 1813

Family Argyresthiidae

Argyresthia abdominalis Zeller, 1839
Argyresthia albistria (Haworth, 1828)
Argyresthia aurulentella Stainton, 1849
Argyresthia bonnetella (Linnaeus, 1758)
Argyresthia brockeella (Hübner, 1813)
Argyresthia conjugella Zeller, 1839
Argyresthia curvella (Linnaeus, 1761)
Argyresthia fundella (Fischer von Röslerstamm, 1835)
Argyresthia glaucinella Zeller, 1839
Argyresthia goedartella (Linnaeus, 1758)
Argyresthia ivella (Haworth, 1828)
Argyresthia pruniella (Clerck, 1759)
Argyresthia pulchella Lienig & Zeller, 1846
Argyresthia pygmaeella (Denis & Schiffermuller, 1775)
Argyresthia retinella Zeller, 1839
Argyresthia semifusca (Haworth, 1828)
Argyresthia semitestacella (Curtis, 1833)
Argyresthia sorbiella (Treitschke, 1833)
Argyresthia spinosella Stainton, 1849
Argyresthia submontana Frey, 1871
Argyresthia amiantella (Zeller, 1847)
Argyresthia arceuthina Zeller, 1839
Argyresthia bergiella (Ratzeburg, 1840)
Argyresthia buvati Gibeaux, 1992
Argyresthia chrysidella Peyerimhoff, 1877
Argyresthia dilectella Zeller, 1847
Argyresthia glabratella (Zeller, 1847)
Argyresthia illuminatella Zeller, 1839
Argyresthia laevigatella Herrich-Schaffer, 1855
Argyresthia praecocella Zeller, 1839
Argyresthia reticulata Staudinger, 1877
Argyresthia thuriferana Gibeaux, 1992
Argyresthia trifasciata Staudinger, 1871

Family Autostichidae

Apatema impunctella Amsel, 1940
Apatema mediopallidum Walsingham, 1900
Aprominta cryptogamarum (Milliere, 1872)
Deroxena venosulella (Moschler, 1862)
Donaspastus delicatella (Walsingham, 1901)
Dysspastus fallax (Gozmany, 1961)
Dysspastus perpygmaeella (Walsingham, 1901)
Holcopogon bubulcellus (Staudinger, 1859)
Oegoconia caradjai Popescu-Gorj & Capuse, 1965
Oegoconia deauratella (Herrich-Schaffer, 1854)
Oegoconia huemeri Sutter, 2007
Oegoconia novimundi (Busck, 1915)
Oegoconia quadripuncta (Haworth, 1828)
Oegoconia uralskella Popescu-Gorj & Capuse, 1965
Stibaromacha ratella (Herrich-Schaffer, 1854)
Symmoca caliginella Mann, 1867
Symmoca cinerariella (Mann, 1859)
Symmoca oenophila Staudinger, 1871
Symmoca orphnella Rebel, 1893
Symmoca signatella Herrich-Schaffer, 1854
Symmoca signella (Hübner, 1796)
Symmocoides oxybiella (Milliere, 1872)
Telephirca quadrifariella (Mann, 1855)

Family Batrachedridae

Batrachedra parvulipunctella Chretien, 1915
Batrachedra pinicolella (Zeller, 1839)
Batrachedra praeangusta (Haworth, 1828)

Family Bedelliidae

Bedellia ehikella Szocs, 1967
Bedellia somnulentella (Zeller, 1847)

Family Blastobasidae

Blastobasis phycidella (Zeller, 1839)
Hypatopa binotella (Thunberg, 1794)
Hypatopa inunctella Zeller, 1839
Hypatopa segnella (Zeller, 1873)
Neoblastobasis ligurica Nel & Varenne, 2004
Tecmerium anthophaga (Staudinger, 1870)
Tecmerium mnemosynella (Milliere, 1876)
Tecmerium rosmarinella (Walsingham, 1901)

Family Brachodidae

Brachodes funebris (Feisthamel, 1833)
Brachodes laeta (Staudinger, 1863)

Family Brahmaeidae

Lemonia dumi (Linnaeus, 1761)
Lemonia taraxaci (Denis & Schiffermuller, 1775)

Family Bucculatricidae

Bucculatrix absinthii Gartner, 1865
Bucculatrix alaternella Constant, 1890
Bucculatrix albedinella (Zeller, 1839)
Bucculatrix albella Stainton, 1867
Bucculatrix albiguttella Milliere, 1886
Bucculatrix alpina Frey, 1870
Bucculatrix argentisignella Herrich-Schaffer, 1855
Bucculatrix artemisiella Herrich-Schaffer, 1855
Bucculatrix bechsteinella (Bechstein & Scharfenberg, 1805)
Bucculatrix cantabricella Chretien, 1898
Bucculatrix cidarella (Zeller, 1839)
Bucculatrix clavenae Klimesch, 1950
Bucculatrix cristatella (Zeller, 1839)
Bucculatrix demaryella (Duponchel, 1840)
Bucculatrix diffusella Menhofer, 1943
Bucculatrix fatigatella Heyden, 1863
Bucculatrix frangutella (Goeze, 1783)
Bucculatrix gnaphaliella (Treitschke, 1833)
Bucculatrix helichrysella Constant, 1889
Bucculatrix humiliella Herrich-Schaffer, 1855
Bucculatrix lavaterella Milliere, 1865
Bucculatrix maritima Stainton, 1851
Bucculatrix myricae Ragonot, 1879
Bucculatrix nigricomella (Zeller, 1839)
Bucculatrix orophilella Nel, 1999
Bucculatrix pyrenaica Nel & Varenne, 2004
Bucculatrix ratisbonensis Stainton, 1861
Bucculatrix santolinella Walsingham, 1898
Bucculatrix thoracella (Thunberg, 1794)
Bucculatrix ulmella Zeller, 1848

Family Castniidae

Paysandisia archon (Burmeister, 1880)

Family Chimabachidae

Dasystoma salicella (Hübner, 1796)
Diurnea fagella (Denis & Schiffermuller, 1775)
Diurnea lipsiella (Denis & Schiffermuller, 1775)

Family Choreutidae

Anthophila fabriciana (Linnaeus, 1767)
Choreutis diana (Hübner, 1822)
Choreutis nemorana (Hübner, 1799)
Choreutis pariana (Clerck, 1759)
Prochoreutis holotoxa (Meyrick, 1903)
Prochoreutis myllerana (Fabricius, 1794)
Prochoreutis sehestediana (Fabricius, 1776)
Prochoreutis stellaris (Zeller, 1847)
Tebenna bjerkandrella (Thunberg, 1784)
Tebenna micalis (Mann, 1857)
Tebenna pretiosana (Duponchel, 1842)

Family Cimeliidae

Axia margarita (Hübner, 1813)
Axia napoleona Schawerda, 1926

Family Coleophoridae

Augasma aeratella (Zeller, 1839)
Coleophora absinthii Wocke, 1877
Coleophora absinthivora Baldizzone, 1990
Coleophora achaenivora Hofmann, 1877
Coleophora acrisella Milliere, 1872
Coleophora acutiphaga Baldizzone, 1982
Coleophora adelogrammella Zeller, 1849
Coleophora adjectella Hering, 1937
Coleophora adjunctella Hodgkinson, 1882
Coleophora adspersella Benander, 1939
Coleophora aestuariella Bradley, 1984
Coleophora afrosarda Baldizzone & Kaltenbach, 1983
Coleophora ahenella Heinemann, 1877
Coleophora albella (Thunberg, 1788)
Coleophora albicans Zeller, 1849
Coleophora albicella Constant, 1885
Coleophora albicosta (Haworth, 1828)
Coleophora albicostella (Duponchel, 1842)
Coleophora albidella (Denis & Schiffermuller, 1775)
Coleophora albilineella Toll, 1960
Coleophora albitarsella Zeller, 1849
Coleophora albulae Frey, 1880
Coleophora alcyonipennella (Kollar, 1832)
Coleophora algidella Staudinger, 1857
Coleophora alnifoliae Barasch, 1934
Coleophora alticolella Zeller, 1849
Coleophora altivagella Toll, 1952
Coleophora amellivora Baldizzone, 1979
Coleophora amethystinella Ragonot, 1855
Coleophora anatipenella (Hübner, 1796)
Coleophora anitella Baldizzone, 1985
Coleophora antennariella Herrich-Schaffer, 1861
Coleophora arctostaphyli Meder, 1934
Coleophora argenteonivea Walsingham, 1907
Coleophora argentula (Stephens, 1834)
Coleophora artemisicolella Bruand, 1855
Coleophora asteris Muhlig, 1864
Coleophora asthenella Constant, 1893
Coleophora astragalella Zeller, 1849
Coleophora atriplicis Meyrick, 1928
Coleophora auricella (Fabricius, 1794)
Coleophora ballotella (Fischer v. Röslerstamm, 1839)
Coleophora bassii Baldizzone, 1989
Coleophora betulella Heinemann, 1877
Coleophora bifrondella Walsingham, 1891
Coleophora bilineatella Zeller, 1849
Coleophora bilineella Herrich-Schaffer, 1855
Coleophora binderella (Kollar, 1832)
Coleophora binotapennella (Duponchel, 1843)
Coleophora brevipalpella Wocke, 1874
Coleophora brunneosignata Toll, 1944
Coleophora burmanni Toll, 1952
Coleophora caelebipennella Zeller, 1839
Coleophora caespititiella Zeller, 1839
Coleophora calycotomella Stainton, 1869
Coleophora cecidophorella Oudejans, 1972
Coleophora centaureivora Baldizzone, 1998
Coleophora chalcogrammella Zeller, 1839
Coleophora chamaedriella Bruand, 1852
Coleophora chretieni Baldizzone, 1979
Coleophora ciconiella Herrich-Schaffer, 1855
Coleophora cinerea Toll, 1953
Coleophora clypeiferella Hofmann, 1871
Coleophora colutella (Fabricius, 1794)
Coleophora congeriella Staudinger, 1859
Coleophora conspicuella Zeller, 1849
Coleophora conyzae Zeller, 1868
Coleophora coracipennella (Hübner, 1796)
Coleophora cornutella Herrich-Schaffer, 1861
Coleophora coronillae Zeller, 1849
Coleophora corsicella Walsingham, 1898
Coleophora coxi Baldizzone & van der Wolf, 2007
Coleophora cracella (Vallot, 1835)
Coleophora currucipennella Zeller, 1839
Coleophora cyrniella Rebel, 1926
Coleophora deauratella Lienig & Zeller, 1846
Coleophora delmastroella Baldizzone, 2000
Coleophora dentiferella Toll, 1952
Coleophora deviella Zeller, 1847
Coleophora dianthi Herrich-Schaffer, 1855
Coleophora dianthivora Walsingham, 1901
Coleophora didymella Chretien, 1899
Coleophora dignella Toll, 1961
Coleophora directella Zeller, 1849
Coleophora discordella Zeller, 1849
Coleophora ditella Zeller, 1849
Coleophora dubiella Baker, 1888
Coleophora eupepla Gozmany, 1954
Coleophora eupreta Walsingham, 1907
Coleophora femorella Walsingham, 1898
Coleophora flaviella Mann, 1857
Coleophora flavipennella (Duponchel, 1843)
Coleophora follicularis (Vallot, 1802)
Coleophora fringillella Zeller, 1839
Coleophora frischella (Linnaeus, 1758)
Coleophora fuscocuprella Herrich-Schaffer, 1855
Coleophora fuscolineata Walsingham, 1898
Coleophora galatellae Hering, 1942
Coleophora galbulipennella Zeller, 1838
Coleophora gallipennella (Hübner, 1796)
Coleophora gardesanella Toll, 1954
Coleophora gaviaepennella Toll, 1952
Coleophora genistae Stainton, 1857
Coleophora glaucicolella Wood, 1892
Coleophora gnaphalii Zeller, 1839
Coleophora granulatella Zeller, 1849
Coleophora gryphipennella (Hübner, 1796)
Coleophora halophilella Zimmermann, 1926
Coleophora helianthemella Milliere, 1870
Coleophora helichrysiella Krone, 1909
Coleophora hemerobiella (Scopoli, 1763)
Coleophora hermanniella Walsingham, 1898
Coleophora hieronella Zeller, 1849
Coleophora hospitiella Chretien, 1915
Coleophora hyssopi Toll, 1961
Coleophora ibipennella Zeller, 1849
Coleophora idaeella Hofmann, 1869
Coleophora insulicola Toll, 1942
Coleophora inulae Wocke, 1877
Coleophora involucrella Chretien, 1905
Coleophora iperspinata Baldizzone & Nel, 2003
Coleophora juncicolella Stainton, 1851
Coleophora jynxella Baldizzone, 1987
Coleophora kasyi Toll, 1961
Coleophora kautzi Rebel, 1933
Coleophora kuehnella (Goeze, 1783)
Coleophora laricella (Hübner, 1817)
Coleophora lassella Staudinger, 1859
Coleophora ledi Stainton, 1860
Coleophora lessinica Baldizzone, 1980
Coleophora limosipennella (Duponchel, 1843)
Coleophora lineata Toll, 1960
Coleophora lineolea (Haworth, 1828)
Coleophora linosyridella Fuchs, 1880
Coleophora linosyris Hering, 1937
Coleophora lithargyrinella Zeller, 1849
Coleophora lixella Zeller, 1849
Coleophora longicornella Constant, 1893
Coleophora luciennella Nel, 1992
Coleophora lusciniaepennella (Treitschke, 1833)
Coleophora luteolella Staudinger, 1880
Coleophora lutipennella (Zeller, 1838)
Coleophora macrobiella Constant, 1885
Coleophora maritimarum Baldizzone, 2004
Coleophora maritimella Newman, 1863
Coleophora mausolella Chretien, 1908
Coleophora mayrella (Hübner, 1813)
Coleophora medelichensis Krone, 1908
Coleophora mediterranea Baldizzone, 1990
Coleophora meridionella Rebel, 1912
Coleophora millefolii Zeller, 1849
Coleophora milvipennis Zeller, 1839
Coleophora motacillella Zeller, 1849
Coleophora murciana Toll, 1960
Coleophora musculella Muhlig, 1864
Coleophora narbonensis Baldizzone, 1990
Coleophora neli Baldizzone, 2000
Coleophora nepetellae Baldizzone & Nel, 2014
Coleophora nevadella Baldizzone, 1985
Coleophora niveiciliella Hofmann, 1877
Coleophora niveicostella Zeller, 1839
Coleophora niveistrigella Wocke, 1877
Coleophora nubivagella Zeller, 1849
Coleophora nutantella Muhlig & Frey, 1857
Coleophora obscenella Herrich-Schaffer, 1855
Coleophora obtectella Zeller, 1849
Coleophora occitana Baldizzone, 1989
Coleophora ochrea (Haworth, 1828)
Coleophora ochripennella Zeller, 1849
Coleophora onobrychiella Zeller, 1849
Coleophora ononidella Milliere, 1879
Coleophora onopordiella Zeller, 1849
Coleophora orbitella Zeller, 1849
Coleophora oriolella Zeller, 1849
Coleophora ornatipennella (Hübner, 1796)
Coleophora otidipennella (Hübner, 1817)
Coleophora pappiferella Hofmann, 1869
Coleophora paramayrella Nel, 1993
Coleophora paripennella Zeller, 1839
Coleophora partitella Zeller, 1849
Coleophora peisoniella Kasy, 1965
Coleophora pennella (Denis & Schiffermuller, 1775)
Coleophora peribenanderi Toll, 1943
Coleophora picardella Suire, 1934
Coleophora potentillae Elisha, 1885
Coleophora praecursella Zeller, 1847
Coleophora pratella Zeller, 1871
Coleophora preisseckeri Toll, 1942
Coleophora prunifoliae Doets, 1944
Coleophora pseudoditella Baldizzone & Patzak, 1983
Coleophora pseudorepentis Toll, 1960
Coleophora pseudosquamosella Baldizzone & Nel, 2003
Coleophora ptarmicia Walsingham, 1910
Coleophora pulmonariella Ragonot, 1874
Coleophora punctulatella Zeller, 1849
Coleophora pyrenaica Baldizzone, 1980
Coleophora pyrrhulipennella Zeller, 1839
Coleophora quadristraminella Toll, 1961
Coleophora ramosella Zeller, 1849
Coleophora ravillella Toll, 1961
Coleophora rectilineella Fischer v. Röslerstamm, 1843
Coleophora repentis Klimesch, 1947
Coleophora retrodentella Baldizzone & Nel, 2004
Coleophora ribasella Baldizzone, 1982
Coleophora riffelensis Rebel, 1913
Coleophora rudella Toll, 1944
Coleophora salicorniae Heinemann & Wocke, 1877
Coleophora salinella Stainton, 1859
Coleophora santolinella Constant, 1890
Coleophora saponariella Heeger, 1848
Coleophora sardocorsa Baldizzone, 1983
Coleophora sattleri Baldizzone, 1995
Coleophora saturatella Stainton, 1850
Coleophora saxicolella (Duponchel, 1843)
Coleophora scabrida Toll, 1959
Coleophora semicinerea Staudinger, 1859
Coleophora sergiella Falkovitsh, 1979
Coleophora serinipennella Christoph, 1872
Coleophora serpylletorum Hering, 1889
Coleophora serratella (Linnaeus, 1761)
Coleophora serratulella Herrich-Schaffer, 1855
Coleophora settarii Wocke, 1877
Coleophora siccifolia Stainton, 1856
Coleophora silenella Herrich-Schaffer, 1855
Coleophora sisteronica Toll, 1961
Coleophora sodae Baldizzone & Nel, 1993
Coleophora solenella Staudinger, 1859
Coleophora solitariella Zeller, 1849
Coleophora spinella (Schrank, 1802)
Coleophora spumosella Staudinger, 1859
Coleophora squamella Constant, 1885
Coleophora squamosella Stainton, 1856
Coleophora staehelinella Walsingham, 1891
Coleophora sternipennella (Zetterstedt, 1839)
Coleophora striatipennella Nylander in Tengstrom, 1848
Coleophora strigosella Toll, 1960
Coleophora striolatella Zeller, 1849
Coleophora struella Staudinger, 1859
Coleophora succursella Herrich-Schaffer, 1855
Coleophora supinella Ortner, 1949
Coleophora sylvaticella Wood, 1892
Coleophora taeniipennella Herrich-Schaffer, 1855
Coleophora tamesis Waters, 1929
Coleophora tanaceti Muhlig, 1865
Coleophora taygeti Baldizzone, 1983
Coleophora telonica Nel, 1991
Coleophora therinella Tengstrom, 1848
Coleophora thurneri Glaser, 1969
Coleophora tolli Klimesch, 1951
Coleophora treskaensis Toll & Amsel, 1967
Coleophora tricolor Walsingham, 1889
Coleophora trifariella Zeller, 1849
Coleophora trifolii (Curtis, 1832)
Coleophora trigeminella Fuchs, 1881
Coleophora trochilella (Duponchel, 1843)
Coleophora tyrrhaenica Amsel, 1951
Coleophora uliginosella Glitz, 1872
Coleophora unipunctella Zeller, 1849
Coleophora uralensis Toll, 1961
Coleophora vacciniella Herrich-Schaffer, 1861
Coleophora valesianella Zeller, 1849
Coleophora varensis Baldizzone & Nel, 1993
Coleophora variicornis Toll, 1952
Coleophora versurella Zeller, 1849
Coleophora vestalella Staudinger, 1859
Coleophora vestianella (Linnaeus, 1758)
Coleophora vibicella (Hübner, 1813)
Coleophora vibicigerella Zeller, 1839
Coleophora vicinella Zeller, 1849
Coleophora violacea (Strom, 1783)
Coleophora virgatella Zeller, 1849
Coleophora virgaureae Stainton, 1857
Coleophora vitisella Gregson, 1856
Coleophora vulnerariae Zeller, 1839
Coleophora vulpecula Zeller, 1849
Coleophora wockeella Zeller, 1849
Coleophora zelleriella Heinemann, 1854
Coleophora zernyi Toll, 1944
Goniodoma auroguttella (Fischer v. Röslerstamm, 1841)
Goniodoma limoniella (Stainton, 1884)
Goniodoma millierella Ragonot, 1882
Metriotes jaeckhi Baldizzone, 1985
Metriotes lutarea (Haworth, 1828)

Family Cosmopterigidae

Alloclita recisella Staudinger, 1859
Ascalenia vanella (Frey, 1860)
Coccidiphila danilevskyi Sinev, 1997
Coccidiphila gerasimovi Danilevsky, 1950
Coccidiphila ledereriella (Zeller, 1850)
Cosmopterix crassicervicella Chretien, 1896
Cosmopterix lienigiella Zeller, 1846
Cosmopterix orichalcea Stainton, 1861
Cosmopterix pararufella Riedl, 1976
Cosmopterix pulchrimella Chambers, 1875
Cosmopterix schmidiella Frey, 1856
Cosmopterix scribaiella Zeller, 1850
Cosmopterix zieglerella (Hübner, 1810)
Eteobalea albiapicella (Duponchel, 1843)
Eteobalea alypella (Klimesch, 1946)
Eteobalea anonymella (Riedl, 1965)
Eteobalea beata (Walsingham, 1907)
Eteobalea dohrnii (Zeller, 1847)
Eteobalea intermediella (Riedl, 1966)
Eteobalea isabellella (O. G. Costa, 1836)
Eteobalea serratella (Treitschke, 1833)
Eteobalea sumptuosella (Lederer, 1855)
Eteobalea tririvella (Staudinger, 1870)
Gibeauxiella bellaqueifontis (Gibeaux, 1986)
Gibeauxiella reliqua (Gibeaux, 1986)
Gisilia lerautella Gibeaux, 1986
Isidiella divitella (Constant, 1885)
Isidiella nickerlii (Nickerl, 1864)
Limnaecia phragmitella Stainton, 1851
Pancalia leuwenhoekella (Linnaeus, 1761)
Pancalia nodosella (Bruand, 1851)
Pancalia schwarzella (Fabricius, 1798)
Pyroderces argyrogrammos (Zeller, 1847)
Sorhagenia janiszewskae Riedl, 1962
Sorhagenia lophyrella (Douglas, 1846)
Sorhagenia rhamniella (Zeller, 1839)
Stagmatophora heydeniella (Fischer von Röslerstamm, 1838)
Vulcaniella extremella (Wocke, 1871)
Vulcaniella fiordalisa (Petry, 1904)
Vulcaniella grabowiella (Staudinger, 1859)
Vulcaniella pomposella (Zeller, 1839)
Vulcaniella rosmarinella (Walsingham, 1891)

Family Cossidae

Acossus terebra (Denis & Schiffermuller, 1775)
Cossus cossus (Linnaeus, 1758)
Dyspessa ulula (Borkhausen, 1790)
Parahypopta caestrum (Hübner, 1808)
Parahypopta radoti (Homberg, 1911)
Phragmataecia castaneae (Hübner, 1790)
Stygia australis Latreille, 1804
Zeuzera pyrina (Linnaeus, 1761)

Family Crambidae

Acentria ephemerella (Denis & Schiffermuller, 1775)
Achyra nudalis (Hübner, 1796)
Agriphila argentistrigellus (Ragonot, 1888)
Agriphila brioniellus (Zerny, 1914)
Agriphila deliella (Hübner, 1813)
Agriphila geniculea (Haworth, 1811)
Agriphila inquinatella (Denis & Schiffermuller, 1775)
Agriphila latistria (Haworth, 1811)
Agriphila poliellus (Treitschke, 1832)
Agriphila selasella (Hübner, 1813)
Agriphila straminella (Denis & Schiffermuller, 1775)
Agriphila tersellus (Lederer, 1855)
Agriphila tolli (Bleszynski, 1952)
Agriphila trabeatellus (Herrich-Schaffer, 1848)
Agriphila tristella (Denis & Schiffermuller, 1775)
Agrotera nemoralis (Scopoli, 1763)
Anania coronata (Hufnagel, 1767)
Anania crocealis (Hübner, 1796)
Anania funebris (Strom, 1768)
Anania fuscalis (Denis & Schiffermuller, 1775)
Anania hortulata (Linnaeus, 1758)
Anania lancealis (Denis & Schiffermuller, 1775)
Anania luctualis (Hübner, 1793)
Anania oberthuri (Turati, 1913)
Anania perlucidalis (Hübner, 1809)
Anania stachydalis (Germar, 1821)
Anania terrealis (Treitschke, 1829)
Anania testacealis (Zeller, 1847)
Anania verbascalis (Denis & Schiffermuller, 1775)
Anarpia incertalis (Duponchel, 1832)
Ancylolomia disparalis Hübner, 1825
Ancylolomia palpella (Denis & Schiffermuller, 1775)
Ancylolomia tentaculella (Hübner, 1796)
Angustalius malacellus (Duponchel, 1836)
Antigastra catalaunalis (Duponchel, 1833)
Aporodes floralis (Hübner, 1809)
Arnia nervosalis Guenee, 1849
Atralata albofascialis (Treitschke, 1829)
Calamotropha aureliellus (Fischer v. Röslerstamm, 1841)
Calamotropha paludella (Hübner, 1824)
Cataclysta lemnata (Linnaeus, 1758)
Catharia pyrenaealis (Duponchel, 1843)
Catoptria acutangulellus (Herrich-Schaffer, 1847)
Catoptria bolivari (Agenjo, 1947)
Catoptria combinella (Denis & Schiffermuller, 1775)
Catoptria conchella (Denis & Schiffermuller, 1775)
Catoptria corsicellus (Duponchel, 1836)
Catoptria digitellus (Herrich-Schaffer, 1849)
Catoptria europaeica Bleszynski, 1965
Catoptria falsella (Denis & Schiffermuller, 1775)
Catoptria fulgidella (Hübner, 1813)
Catoptria furcatellus (Zetterstedt, 1839)
Catoptria luctiferella (Hübner, 1813)
Catoptria lythargyrella (Hübner, 1796)
Catoptria margaritella (Denis & Schiffermuller, 1775)
Catoptria myella (Hübner, 1796)
Catoptria mytilella (Hübner, 1805)
Catoptria permutatellus (Herrich-Schaffer, 1848)
Catoptria petrificella (Hübner, 1796)
Catoptria pinella (Linnaeus, 1758)
Catoptria pyramidellus (Treitschke, 1832)
Catoptria radiella (Hübner, 1813)
Catoptria speculalis Hübner, 1825
Catoptria staudingeri (Zeller, 1863)
Catoptria verellus (Zincken, 1817)
Catoptria zermattensis (Frey, 1870)
Chilo luteellus (Motschulsky, 1866)
Chilo phragmitella (Hübner, 1805)
Chilo pulverosellus Ragonot, 1895
Chilo suppressalis (Walker, 1863)
Cholius luteolaris (Scopoli, 1772)
Chrysocrambus craterella (Scopoli, 1763)
Chrysocrambus linetella (Fabricius, 1781)
Chrysoteuchia culmella (Linnaeus, 1758)
Cleptotypodes ledereri (Staudinger, 1870)
Crambus alienellus Germar & Kaulfuss, 1817
Crambus cyrnellus Schawerda, 1926
Crambus ericella (Hübner, 1813)
Crambus hamella (Thunberg, 1788)
Crambus lathoniellus (Zincken, 1817)
Crambus palustrellus Ragonot, 1876
Crambus pascuella (Linnaeus, 1758)
Crambus perlella (Scopoli, 1763)
Crambus pratella (Linnaeus, 1758)
Crambus silvella (Hübner, 1813)
Crambus uliginosellus Zeller, 1850
Cynaeda dentalis (Denis & Schiffermuller, 1775)
Cynaeda gigantea (Wocke, 1871)
Diasemia reticularis (Linnaeus, 1761)
Diasemiopsis ramburialis (Duponchel, 1834)
Diplopseustis perieresalis (Walker, 1859)
Dolicharthria aetnaealis (Duponchel, 1833)
Dolicharthria bruguieralis (Duponchel, 1833)
Dolicharthria punctalis (Denis & Schiffermuller, 1775)
Dolicharthria stigmosalis (Herrich-Schaffer, 1848)
Donacaula forficella (Thunberg, 1794)
Donacaula mucronella (Denis & Schiffermuller, 1775)
Duponchelia fovealis Zeller, 1847
Ecpyrrhorrhoe diffusalis (Guenee, 1854)
Ecpyrrhorrhoe rubiginalis (Hübner, 1796)
Elophila bourgognei Leraut, 2001
Elophila nymphaeata (Linnaeus, 1758)
Elophila rivulalis (Duponchel, 1834)
Emprepes pudicalis (Duponchel, 1832)
Ephelis cruentalis (Geyer, 1832)
Euchromius anapiellus (Zeller, 1847)
Euchromius bella (Hübner, 1796)
Euchromius cambridgei (Zeller, 1867)
Euchromius gozmanyi Bleszynski, 1961
Euchromius gratiosella (Caradja, 1910)
Euchromius mouchai Bleszynski, 1961
Euchromius ocellea (Haworth, 1811)
Euchromius ramburiellus (Duponchel, 1836)
Euchromius superbellus (Zeller, 1849)
Euchromius vinculellus (Zeller, 1847)
Eudonia angustea (Curtis, 1827)
Eudonia delunella (Stainton, 1849)
Eudonia lacustrata (Panzer, 1804)
Eudonia liebmanni (Petry, 1904)
Eudonia lineola (Curtis, 1827)
Eudonia mercurella (Linnaeus, 1758)
Eudonia murana (Curtis, 1827)
Eudonia pallida (Curtis, 1827)
Eudonia petrophila (Standfuss, 1848)
Eudonia phaeoleuca (Zeller, 1846)
Eudonia senecaensis Huemer & Leraut, 1993
Eudonia sudetica (Zeller, 1839)
Eudonia truncicolella (Stainton, 1849)
Eudonia vallesialis (Duponchel, 1832)
Eurrhypis guttulalis (Herrich-Schaffer, 1848)
Eurrhypis pollinalis (Denis & Schiffermuller, 1775)
Evergestis aenealis (Denis & Schiffermuller, 1775)
Evergestis dumerlei Leraut, 2003
Evergestis extimalis (Scopoli, 1763)
Evergestis forficalis (Linnaeus, 1758)
Evergestis frumentalis (Linnaeus, 1761)
Evergestis isatidalis (Duponchel, 1833)
Evergestis limbata (Linnaeus, 1767)
Evergestis marionalis Leraut, 2003
Evergestis marocana (D. Lucas, 1856)
Evergestis mundalis (Guenee, 1854)
Evergestis pallidata (Hufnagel, 1767)
Evergestis politalis (Denis & Schiffermuller, 1775)
Evergestis segetalis (Herrich-Schaffer, 1851)
Evergestis sophialis (Fabricius, 1787)
Friedlanderia cicatricella (Hübner, 1824)
Gesneria centuriella (Denis & Schiffermuller, 1775)
Heliothela wulfeniana (Scopoli, 1763)
Hellula undalis (Fabricius, 1781)
Hodebertia testalis (Fabricius, 1794)
Hydriris ornatalis (Duponchel, 1832)
Hyperlais nemausalis (Duponchel, 1834)
Hyperlais rosseti Varenne, 2009
Hyperlais siccalis Guenee, 1854
Krombia venturalis Luquet & Minet, 1982
Loxostege aeruginalis (Hübner, 1796)
Loxostege comptalis (Freyer, 1848)
Loxostege fascialis (Hübner, 1796)
Loxostege manualis (Geyer, 1832)
Loxostege scutalis (Hübner, 1813)
Loxostege sticticalis (Linnaeus, 1761)
Loxostege tesselalis (Guenee, 1854)
Loxostege turbidalis (Treitschke, 1829)
Loxostege virescalis (Guenee, 1854)
Mecyna asinalis (Hübner, 1819)
Mecyna auralis (Peyerimhoff, 1872)
Mecyna flavalis (Denis & Schiffermuller, 1775)
Mecyna lutealis (Duponchel, 1833)
Mecyna marcidalis (Fuchs, 1879)
Mecyna trinalis (Denis & Schiffermuller, 1775)
Metacrambus carectellus (Zeller, 1847)
Metacrambus pallidellus (Duponchel, 1836)
Metasia carnealis (Treitschke, 1829)
Metasia corsicalis (Duponchel, 1833)
Metasia cuencalis Ragonot, 1894
Metasia cyrnealis Schawerda, 1926
Metasia hymenalis Guenee, 1854
Metasia ibericalis Ragonot, 1894
Metasia olbienalis Guenee, 1854
Metasia ophialis (Treitschke, 1829)
Metasia suppandalis (Hübner, 1823)
Metaxmeste phrygialis (Hübner, 1796)
Metaxmeste schrankiana (Hochenwarth, 1785)
Nascia cilialis (Hübner, 1796)
Nomophila noctuella (Denis & Schiffermuller, 1775)
Nymphula nitidulata (Hufnagel, 1767)
Orenaia alpestralis (Fabricius, 1787)
Orenaia andereggialis (Herrich-Schaffer, 1851)
Orenaia helveticalis (Herrich-Schaffer, 1851)
Orenaia lugubralis (Lederer, 1857)
Orenaia ventosalis Chretien, 1911
Ostrinia nubilalis (Hübner, 1796)
Palepicorsia ustrinalis (Christoph, 1877)
Palpita vitrealis (Rossi, 1794)
Paracorsia repandalis (Denis & Schiffermuller, 1775)
Parapoynx stratiotata (Linnaeus, 1758)
Paratalanta hyalinalis (Hübner, 1796)
Paratalanta pandalis (Hübner, 1825)
Pediasia aridella (Thunberg, 1788)
Pediasia contaminella (Hübner, 1796)
Pediasia fascelinella (Hübner, 1813)
Pediasia luteella (Denis & Schiffermuller, 1775)
Pediasia pedriolellus (Duponchel, 1836)
Pediasia subflavellus (Duponchel, 1836)
Platytes alpinella (Hübner, 1813)
Platytes cerussella (Denis & Schiffermuller, 1775)
Pleuroptya balteata (Fabricius, 1798)
Pleuroptya crocealis (Duponchel, 1834)
Pleuroptya ruralis (Scopoli, 1763)
Psammotis pulveralis (Hübner, 1796)
Pyrausta acontialis (Staudinger, 1859)
Pyrausta aerealis (Hübner, 1793)
Pyrausta aurata (Scopoli, 1763)
Pyrausta castalis Treitschke, 1829
Pyrausta cingulata (Linnaeus, 1758)
Pyrausta coracinalis Leraut, 1982
Pyrausta despicata (Scopoli, 1763)
Pyrausta falcatalis Guenee, 1854
Pyrausta nigrata (Scopoli, 1763)
Pyrausta obfuscata (Scopoli, 1763)
Pyrausta ostrinalis (Hübner, 1796)
Pyrausta porphyralis (Denis & Schiffermuller, 1775)
Pyrausta purpuralis (Linnaeus, 1758)
Pyrausta sanguinalis (Linnaeus, 1767)
Pyrausta virginalis Duponchel, 1832
Schoenobius gigantella (Denis & Schiffermuller, 1775)
Scirpophaga praelata (Scopoli, 1763)
Sclerocona acutella (Eversmann, 1842)
Scoparia ambigualis (Treitschke, 1829)
Scoparia ancipitella (La Harpe, 1855)
Scoparia basistrigalis Knaggs, 1866
Scoparia conicella (La Harpe, 1863)
Scoparia gallica Peyerimhoff, 1873
Scoparia ingratella (Zeller, 1846)
Scoparia manifestella (Herrich-Schaffer, 1848)
Scoparia pyralella (Denis & Schiffermuller, 1775)
Scoparia staudingeralis (Mabille, 1869)
Scoparia subfusca Haworth, 1811
Sitochroa palealis (Denis & Schiffermuller, 1775)
Sitochroa verticalis (Linnaeus, 1758)
Spoladea recurvalis (Fabricius, 1775)
Tegostoma comparalis (Hübner, 1796)
Thisanotia chrysonuchella (Scopoli, 1763)
Thopeutis galleriellus (Ragonot, 1892)
Titanio tarraconensis Leraut & Luquet, 1982
Udea accolalis (Zeller, 1867)
Udea alpinalis (Denis & Schiffermuller, 1775)
Udea austriacalis (Herrich-Schaffer, 1851)
Udea bipunctalis (Herrich-Schaffer, 1851)
Udea bourgognealis Leraut, 1996
Udea costalis (Eversmann, 1852)
Udea cyanalis (La Harpe, 1855)
Udea decrepitalis (Herrich-Schaffer, 1848)
Udea elutalis (Denis & Schiffermuller, 1775)
Udea ferrugalis (Hübner, 1796)
Udea fimbriatralis (Duponchel, 1834)
Udea fulvalis (Hübner, 1809)
Udea hamalis (Thunberg, 1788)
Udea inquinatalis (Lienig & Zeller, 1846)
Udea institalis (Hübner, 1819)
Udea lerautalis Tautel, 2014
Udea lutealis (Hübner, 1809)
Udea murinalis (Fischer v. Röslerstamm, 1842)
Udea nebulalis (Hübner, 1796)
Udea numeralis (Hübner, 1796)
Udea olivalis (Denis & Schiffermuller, 1775)
Udea prunalis (Denis & Schiffermuller, 1775)
Udea rhododendronalis (Duponchel, 1834)
Udea rubigalis (Guenee, 1854)
Udea uliginosalis (Stephens, 1834)
Uresiphita gilvata (Fabricius, 1794)
Xanthocrambus caducellus (Muller-Rutz, 1909)
Xanthocrambus delicatellus (Zeller, 1863)
Xanthocrambus lucellus (Herrich-Schaffer, 1848)
Xanthocrambus saxonellus (Zincken, 1821)

References 

Metropolitan France